Curtis Arthur Reid (25 March 1876 – 12 May 1912) was an Australian rules footballer who played with Melbourne in the Victorian Football League (VFL).

Family
The son of wine maker and cricketer, Curtis Alexander Reid (1838-1886), and Sophia Louisa Reid (1843-1923), née Dight, Curtis Arthur Reid was born at his father's Tarrawingee vineyard on 25 March 1876.

He married Mary Elizabeth "Bessie" Tullidge (1875-), in Perth, on 28 November 1904.

Education
Trained as a surveyor, he was admitted to the Queensland Institute of Surveyors in 1907.

Football

Melbourne (VFL)
Cleared to Melbourne from the Rovers Football Club in May 1899.

East Fremantle (WAFL)
He was granted a clearance to East Fremantle in July 1903.

Death
He died at the Charleville Hospital in Queensland on 12 May 1912, of "typhoid fever accelerated by heart failure", having "become ill while surveying the Crown lands at Nebine Creek".
Many of the younger generation in Melbourne will regret to learn of the death of Mr. Curtis A. Reid at the early age of thirty-six. The late Mr. Reid died at Charlesville, Queensland, on Sunday last from typhoid fever. He had a large survey party out in the north, when he was attacked by fever, to which he succumbed after a few days' illness. When telegraphic news arrived of the attack, his wife hurried from Melbourne, and had the melancholy consolation of being with him in his last hours. His father, Curtis A. Reid, was at one time a leading light in Melbourne journalistic and cricketing circles, being for many years secretary of the Melbourne Cricket Club. The younger Curtis was equally well known and beloved by a large circle of friends. In addition to a widow he leaves two children, one of them being only a few months old. — Punch, 16 May 1912.

Notes

References

External links

Demonwiki profile

1876 births
Australian rules footballers from Western Australia
Rovers Football Club players
Melbourne Football Club players
East Fremantle Football Club players
1912 deaths
Australian people of Scottish descent
Australian rules footballers from Victoria (Australia)